Samuel Charles Callis (born 21 November 1973 in Ely, Cambridgeshire) is an English actor and director, best known for his role as Callum Stone in The Bill and Adam Benjamin in London's Burning.

Biography
Callis grew up in Haslemere, Surrey and attended Camelsdale Primary School, Midhurst Intermediate School and Midhurst Grammar School. Callis trained at the London Academy of Music and Dramatic Art. He has had roles in London's Burning where he played Adam Benjamin and in  Ultimate Force as Captain Patrick Fleming. He played Doctor Mike Banner in The Royal until he left in 2007 to join the cast of The Bill. He has made appearances in Holby City, Casualty and Doctor Who.

Before joining The Bill as a regular, he had previously guest starred in the show in 2004 as an alcoholic priest, Karl Radford.

Callis has also acted in some films.  In Kidulthood he played a security guard, in Spanish TV Movie Trance he played Nick, in Capital Punishment he played Russell Blake and he starred in Shrink as Max.

He has acted in theatre which has taken him to New York and on a UK no1 Tour for Arms and The Man.

After The Bill was cancelled in 2010, Callis directed a short film called Inside Run. The short film starred his former The Bill co-star Andrew Lancel as a prison officer and was shown at the BFI London Film Festival in October 2010. More recently he directed another short film, Viking also starring Andrew Lancel.

Callis played the role of Stensgard in the UK premiere of Henrik Ibsen's The League of Youth at Nottingham Playhouse in May 2011. In 2012 he appeared in the Noël Coward play Hay Fever at the Noël Coward Theatre and as Jack Worthing in The Importance of Being Earnest at Nottingham Playhouse.

In 2015 he produced Whisper a ten-minute short film set in Sheppey.

Personal life
He met his wife Osmin during his time on London's Burning and the couple reside in London. In December 2008, he became a father for the first time with the birth of his daughter. He also has a son. His brother, Ben Callis, is a film director.

Filmography

Television

Released films

Stage

References

External links
 
 Sam Callis fansite

Alumni of the London Academy of Music and Dramatic Art
English male television actors
Living people
1973 births
People from Ely, Cambridgeshire
English film directors
Male actors from Cambridgeshire
20th-century English male actors
21st-century English male actors
People educated at Midhurst Grammar School